Arsenio Lope Huerta (15 November 1943 – 2 January 2021) was a Spanish writer and politician.

References

1943 births
2021 deaths
Spanish writers
Spanish Socialist Workers' Party politicians
People from Alcalá de Henares